Macro-Otomákoan is a proposal linking three small language families of the Amazon: The Harákmbut (Tuyoneri) family, the extinct Otomakoan languages, and the Trumai language isolate. It was proposed by Kaufman (1990) and slightly modified in Kaufman (2007).

References

Proposed language families